Lieutenant General John Stephen Kolasheski is a senior officer in the United States Army and the current commanding general of V Corps.

Military career
John S. Kolasheski was assigned to the 1st Infantry Division from 2001 to 2005. He was deployed in support of Operation Iraqi Freedom as well as Operation Enduring Freedom.

Kolasheski was the Deputy Commanding General (Maneuver) of the 1st Infantry Division from 2015 to 2016. He was also Commandant of the United States Army Armor School and Deputy Commanding General at the Maneuver Center of Excellence at Fort Benning.

Kolasheski has also previously served as Deputy Chief of Staff, G-3/5/7 for U.S. Armed Forces Command at Fort Bragg.

Kolasheski assumed command of the 1st Infantry Division in 2018.

In May 2020, Kolasheski was nominated to command the newly reactivated V Corps. Kolasheski was confirmed to the rank of lieutenant general on May 21, 2020. He was promoted to lieutenant general on August 4, 2020 after relinquishing command of the 1st Infantry Division to his deputy Brigadier General Thomas W. O'Connor Jr.

Education
Kolasheski is a 1989 graduate of Bucknell University in Lewisburg, Pennsylvania, where he earned a bachelor's degree in business administration. He has a master's degree in engineering management and interactive simulations from the University of Central Florida. He also has a degree in strategic studies from the United States Army War College.

References

Living people
American people of Polish descent
Bucknell University alumni
University of Central Florida alumni
United States Army War College alumni
United States Army personnel of the Iraq War
United States Army personnel of the War in Afghanistan (2001–2021)
Recipients of the Defense Superior Service Medal
Recipients of the Legion of Merit
United States Army generals
1966 births